Yerba Loca Nature Sanctuary is a national reserve of Chile.

References

External links
 Yerba Loca Nature Sanctuary 

National reserves of Chile
Principal Cordillera
Protected areas of Santiago Metropolitan Region